Patti Wicks (born Patricia Ellen Chappell; February 24, 1945 – March 7, 2014) was an American jazz singer and pianist.

Career
Wicks began playing the piano at the age of three and later attended the Crane School of Music at the State University of New York at Potsdam. Influenced by Bill Evans, she began to perform professionally and moved to New York City, where she played in small ensembles. She also directed her own trio, featuring bassists such as Sam Jones, Richard Davis, Brian Torff, and Mark Dresser, and drummers Curtis Boyd, Louis Hayes, Mickey Roker, and Alan Dawson. In the 1970s, she moved to Florida, where she worked as a musician with, among others, Clark Terry, Larry Coryell, Frank Morgan, Ira Sullivan, Flip Phillips, Anita O'Day, Rebecca Parris, Roseanna Vitro and Giacomo Gates. In addition, she taught jazz piano at colleges and gave private lessons. In 1997, she released her debut album Room at the Top: The Patti Wicks Trio. She was a guest on Marian McPartland's NPR program Piano Jazz. According to Allmusic, she sang in the tradition of Jeri Southern, Nina Simone and Shirley Horn.

Discography
 Room at the Top (Recycle Notes, 1997)
 Love Locked Out (Maxjazz, 2003)
 Basic Feeling (Egea, 2005)
 Italian Sessions (Studiottanta Fortuna, 2007)
 It's a Good Day (Geco, 2008)
 Dedicated To (2009)

External links

References

1945 births
2014 deaths
Jazz musicians from New York (state)
People from Islip (town), New York
Crane School of Music alumni
20th-century American women pianists
20th-century American pianists
20th-century American women singers
21st-century American women pianists
21st-century American pianists
21st-century American women singers
American women jazz singers
American jazz singers
American jazz pianists
Women jazz pianists
20th-century American singers
21st-century American singers